Warren Dawson may refer to:

 Warren Royal Dawson (1888–1968), English Egyptologist
 Warren Dawson, bassist for the Kings of Rhythm